Fukiage may refer to:

Fukiage, Kagoshima (吹上町, Fukiage-chō), a town located in Hioki District, Kagoshima, Japan
Fukiage, Saitama (吹上町; -machi), a town located in Kitaadachi District, Saitama, Japan
Sataro Fukiage (1889–1926), Japanese rapist and serial killer
Fukiage Garden, at the Tokyo Imperial Palace